Phytoecia faldermanni is a species of beetle in the family Cerambycidae. It was described by Faldermann in 1837. It is known from Russia, Azerbaijan, Kazakhstan, Armenia, Georgia, and Ukraine.

References

Phytoecia
Beetles described in 1837